O Inventor de Sonhos is a 2012 Brazilian drama film directed by Ricardo Nauenberg. The film was released in Brazil on October 11, 2013.

The film is set in Rio de Janeiro in 1808 and follows the vision of two boys: an Afro-Brazilian, son of a slave, and a young European adventurer in search for his real father.

Cast 
Ícaro Silva as	José Trazimundo 
Miguel Thiré as Luís Bernardo
Sheron Menezzes as Iaínha 
Ricardo Blat as Vilaça
Roberto Bonfim	as Eustáquio
Miguel de Oliveira as José Trazimundo 
Stênio Garcia as Aristides
Guilhermina Guinle as Laura Leonor
Sérgio Mamberti as Duke of Alva

References

External links
  
 

2012 films
Films set in Rio de Janeiro (city)
Films set in the 1800s
Brazilian historical drama films
Films about Brazilian slavery
2010s historical drama films
2012 drama films
2010s Portuguese-language films